Marshall Park is a  park in Seattle, Washington. Once known as "Phelps Place", the small park across from Parsons Garden provided a viewpoint for sightseers until the expansion and improvement of Queen Anne Boulevard. In 1960, the park was named after the Marshalls. Betty Bowen Viewpoint was added to the park in 1977–1978. Today, the concrete walkway contains unsigned artwork by artists Guy Anderson, Kenneth Callahan, Morris Graves, Victor Steinbrueck, Charles Stokes and Margaret Tompkins.

See also
 List of parks in Seattle

References

External links
 

Parks in Seattle
Queen Anne, Seattle